Beaver Island Township is one of nine townships in Stokes County, North Carolina, United States. The township had a population of 3,565 according to the 2000 census.

Geographically, Beaver Island Township occupies  in eastern Stokes County.  There are no incorporated municipalities located inside Beaver Island Township.  The township's eastern border is with Rockingham County, North Carolina.

Townships in Stokes County, North Carolina
Townships in North Carolina